Tomás Pedro Barbosa da Silva Nunes (December 3, 1942 – September 1, 2010) was the Portuguese Auxiliary bishop of the Patriarch of Lisbon from his appointment on March 7, 1998, until his death on September 1, 2010. He also served as the Titular bishop of the Diocese de Elvas in Portugal.

Tomás Pedro Barbosa da Silva Nunes  was born in Lisbon, Portugal on December 3, 1942. He died on September 1, 2010, at the age of 67.

References

1942 births
2010 deaths
21st-century Roman Catholic bishops in Portugal
21st-century Roman Catholic titular bishops
People from Lisbon